EC number may refer to:

 Enzyme Commission number for enzymes
 European Community number for chemicals within EU regulatory schemes